Garrison's Finish is a 1923 American silent sports drama film directed by Arthur Rosson and starring Jack Pickford, Madge Bellamy and Clarence Burton.

Cast
 Jack Pickford as Billy Garrison
 Madge Bellamy as Sue Desha
 Clarence Burton as Crimmins
 Charles A. Stevenson as Colonel Desha
 Charles Ogle as Colonel Desha's Trainer
 Ethel Grey Terry as Lilly Allen
 Tom Guise as Major Desha
 Frank Elliott as Mr. Waterbury
 Audrey Chapman as Sue's Friend
 Dorothy Manners as Sue's Friend
 Herbert Prior as Judge of Race Course
 Lydia Knott as Billy's Mother

References

Bibliography
 Robert B. Connelly. The Silents: Silent Feature Films, 1910-36, Volume 40, Issue 2. December Press, 1998.

External links
 

1923 films
1920s sports drama films
American silent feature films
American black-and-white films
Films directed by Arthur Rosson
American horse racing films
1920s English-language films
1920s American films
Silent sports drama films